Communauté d'agglomération du Niortais is the communauté d'agglomération, an intercommunal structure, centred on the city of Niort. It is located in the Deux-Sèvres department, in the Nouvelle-Aquitaine region, western France. It was created in January 2014 by the merger of the former Communauté d'agglomération de Niort with the former communauté de communes Plaine de Courances and the commune Germond-Rouvre. Its seat is in Niort. Its area is 815.4 km2. Its population was 120,733 in 2017, of which 58,707 in Niort proper.

Composition
The communauté d'agglomération consists of the following 40 communes:

Aiffres
Amuré
Arçais
Beauvoir-sur-Niort
Bessines
Le Bourdet
Brûlain
Chauray
Coulon
Échiré
Épannes
Fors
La Foye-Monjault
Frontenay-Rohan-Rohan
Germond-Rouvre
Granzay-Gript
Juscorps
Magné
Marigny
Mauzé-sur-le-Mignon
Niort
Plaine-d'Argenson
Prahecq
Prin-Deyrançon
La Rochénard
Saint-Gelais
Saint-Georges-de-Rex
Saint-Hilaire-la-Palud
Saint-Martin-de-Bernegoue
Saint-Maxire
Saint-Rémy
Saint-Romans-des-Champs
Saint-Symphorien
Sansais
Sciecq
Val-du-Mignon
Vallans
Le Vanneau-Irleau
Villiers-en-Plaine
Vouillé

References

Niortais
Intercommunalities of Deux-Sèvres